Katie Says Goodbye is a 2016 drama film written and directed by Wayne Roberts in his directorial debut. The film stars Olivia Cooke, Mireille Enos, Christopher Abbott, Mary Steenburgen, Jim Belushi, Keir Gilchrist and Chris Lowell.

The film had its world premiere at the Toronto International Film Festival. It was released on June 7, 2019, by Vertical Entertainment.

Plot
Katie is a kindhearted seventeen-year-old waitress who lives in a hamlet in rural Arizona with her mother Tracey who has a difficult time in keeping up with bills. To overcome poverty, escape her boring life, and fulfill her plan to move to San Francisco, Katie has relations with truckers, her main 'johns'.

Katie befriends and begins a relationship with local mechanic and ex-convict Bruno. He finds out she is prostituting herself, he asks her to stop and she agrees. Katie is seen with another waitress's married father who offered a ride home and it is assumed she is having sex despite Katie’s attempts to back him off.

Katie is picked up by two of Bruno's coworkers under the guise of a ride home but is taken to a rural area and is beaten and raped by them. Bruno thinks they paid her for sex after they brag about having sex with her, so he responds by brutally assaulting them.

Bruno confronts a bruised Katie and assaults a truck driver who assumed her bruises were caused by Bruno. He drives Katie to a rural area where he blames her for the assault, ends their relationship and is subsequently arrested. Tracey leaves with a married man and Katie's money, without having paid the rent. Katie is forced to abandon the trailer she shared with her mother.

At work, another waitress accuses Katie of stealing money from the restaurant, making Katie feel unwanted there too, despite what the owner says. She decides to accept the blame, quitting her job, and confronts the other waitress for lying, who shows regret. As she leaves the restaurant, Katie falls to the ground sobbing, she then picks herself up and attempts to hitchhike.

Cast
 Olivia Cooke as Katie, a waitress and prostitute
 Mireille Enos as Tracey, Katie's mother
 Christopher Abbott as Bruno, a mechanic whom Katie has a relationship with
 Mary Steenburgen as Maybelle, Katie's boss at the diner
 Jim Belushi as Bear, a trucker and one of Katie's clients
 Keir Gilchrist as Matty, Bruno's co-worker
 Chris Lowell as Dirk, Bruno's co-worker
 Natasha Bassett as Sara
 Gene Jones as Mr. Willard

Production
On March 23, 2015, it was announced that Olivia Cooke had been cast in the film in title role of Katie, alongside Mireille Enos as Katie's mother, and Christopher Abbott as Katie's love interest. Jim Belushi portrays one of Katie's clients, with Mary Steenburgen playing the role of the diner owner where Katie works. The script was written by Wayne Roberts, who also directed the feature; the film marks his directoral debut. The film was produced by Sean Durkin who directed Martha Marcy May Marlene, and was executive produced by Antonio Campos and Josh Mond. Roberts was inspired to direct the film after Campos and Durkin suggested he should. Dan Romer composed the film's score.

Principal photography began in March 2015 in New Mexico. and concluded on April 30, 2015.

Release
In August 2016, the first image of Cooke was released. The film had its world premiere at the Toronto International Film Festival. It was released on June 7, 2019, by Vertical Entertainment.

Critical reception
On review aggregator website Rotten Tomatoes, the film received a critic approval rating of 45%, based on 20 reviews, with an average rating of 5/10.

References

External links
 

2016 films
2016 drama films
2016 independent films
Adultery in films
American drama films
American independent films
Films about dysfunctional families
Films about prostitution in the United States
Films scored by Dan Romer
Films set in Arizona
Films shot in New Mexico
French drama films
English-language French films
French independent films
Vertical Entertainment films
2016 directorial debut films
2010s English-language films
2010s American films
2010s French films